Sarri Amel Mohammadia, known as SA Mohammadia or simply SAM for short, is an Algerian football club located in Mohammadia, Mascara, Algeria. The club was founded in 1930 and its colours are orange and green. Their home stadium, Stade Mohamed Ouali, has a capacity of 10,000 spectators. The club is currently playing in the Ligue Nationale du Football Amateur.

External links
Team profile – Soccerway.com

Football clubs in Algeria
Association football clubs established in 1930
Mascara Province
Algerian Ligue 2 clubs
1930 establishments in Algeria
Sports clubs in Algeria